Bahçeköy is a neighborhood of Sarıyer district in Istanbul Province, Turkey.

Institutions within its boundaries are Faculty of Forestry, Forestry Administration, Water and Sewerage Authority. A number of historic dams, Belgrad Forest, Bentler Nature Park, Atatürk Arboretum are visitor attractions of Bahçeköy.

Background
The establishment of Bahçeköy goes back to 1521 in the Ottoman Empire. Later, Muslim Turks from Salonica Vilayet, former territory of the Ottoman Empire, were settled here in the frame of population exchange between Greece and Turkey agreed with the Treaty of Lausanne in 1923. The settlement received migration from all over Turkey. As of 2010, the population of Bahçeköy is 3,870.

Following a local referendum, the settlement gained the right to be converted from a village status into a municipality. The first mayor election took place in 1997. In 2008, Constitutional Court of Turkey annulled its status as a municipality, and it became a neighborhood of Sarıyer district.

See also
 Topuzlu Dam, built in 1750
 Valide Dam, built in 1796
 New Dam, built in 1830

References

Neighbourhoods of Sarıyer
Populated places in Istanbul Province
Belgrad Forest